Toshihide Matsui and Frederik Nielsen were the defending champions but only Matsui chose to defend his title, partnering Ričardas Berankis. Matsui lost in the first round to Nam Ji-sung and Song Min-kyu.

Max Purcell and Luke Saville won the title after defeating Ruben Bemelmans and Sergiy Stakhovsky 6–4, 7–6(9–7) in the final.

Seeds

Draw

References
 Main draw

Seoul Open Challenger - Doubles
2019 Doubles